Xara may refer to:

 Xara, a main character in Minecraft Story Mode Season 2
 Xara, a UK-based software company
 XARA, the abbreviation of Unauthorized Cross-App Resource Access a category of software exploits
 Xara, nickname of Angolan footballer Fernando Agostinho da Costa (born 1981)

See also
 Khara inc., a Japanese anime production company